The Democrats for Liechtenstein (abbreviated DpL) is a political party in Liechtenstein. Formed as a splinter of The Independents in September 2018, the party initially held three seats in the Landtag of Liechtenstein. It won 11.1% of votes and two seats in the 2021 general election.

History
On 16 August 2018, Landtag member Erich Hasler was expelled from The Independents (DU) under controversial circumstances. Thomas Rehak and Herbert Elkuch, also members of the Landtag representing The Independents, subsequently left the party in opposition to Hasler's expulsion. The three founded a new parliamentary group, provisionally named "New Faction". This left The Independents with only two members of the Landtag; the new group was granted DU's seat in the presidium of the Landtag. The Democrats for Liechtenstein (DpL) party was officially founded on 21 September 2018, with Thomas Rehak becoming its leader.

There was initially controversy about whether the DpL was entitled to public funding, since it had entered the Landtag without standing for election. In February 2019, the Administrative Court granted DpL the annual lump sum of CHF 55,000 which all parties represented in the Landtag are entitled to under the Political Party Financing Act.

Political positions
The DpL, along with the DU, is considered ideologically right-wing populist. It is skeptical of migration and European integration.

Electoral results

Landtag elections

Local elections

References

External links
  

2018 establishments in Liechtenstein
Political parties in Liechtenstein
Political parties established in 2018